"It's Getting Better All the Time" is a song written by Ronnie Bowman and Don Cook, and recorded by American country music duo Brooks & Dunn that reached the top of the Billboard Hot Country Songs chart.  It was released in November 2004 as the second single from their compilation album The Greatest Hits Collection II.

Cover versions
Country music group Rascal Flatts covered the song from The Last Rodeo Tour

Chart positions
"It's Getting Better All the Time" debuted at number 52 on the U.S. Billboard Hot Country Singles & Tracks chart for the week of December 4, 2004.

Year-end charts

References 

2004 singles
Brooks & Dunn songs
Songs written by Ronnie Bowman
Songs written by Don Cook
Song recordings produced by Mark Wright (record producer)
Arista Nashville singles
2004 songs